Bemposta is a Portuguese freguesia ("civil parish"), located in Abrantes Municipality, in Santarém District. The population in 2011 was 1,795, in an area of 187.45 km². The parish is by far the largest in the municipality, but also the least densely populated.

References

Freguesias of Abrantes